Jodi Wille is an American film director, curator, and book publisher known for her work exploring American subcultures.

Filmmaking and Photography
Wille directed and produced The Source Family (2013), her first feature-length documentary, with Maria Demopoulos. The film, which unearths the story of the eponymous Los Angeles utopian commune and its charismatic leader, Father Yod, premiered in competition at South by Southwest Film Festival in March 2012, sold out multiple major film festivals, and was released theatrically in 60 cities in May 2013.

Wille is currently directing a feature documentary on The Unarius Academy of Science.

In 1994, R.E.M. gave Wille her first paid directing gig for their "Find the River" music video. Signed to DNA (David Naylor & Associates), she directed a number of music videos in the mid-90s. Wille worked prior to that as assistant to music video and commercial director Samuel Bayer and later as assistant and development consultant to feature film director Roland Joffé.

Throughout the 90s, Wille also worked as a commercial and documentary photographer, shooting billboard campaigns, rock bands and personalities including Sparks (band), Melissa Etheridge, and Vincent Gallo, while also documenting visionary artists and alternative spiritual communities.

Book Publishing
In 1998, Wille co-founded Dilettante Press with Steve Nalepa, Nick Rubenstein, and Hedi El Kholti, a publishing house with a focus on self-taught, visionary, and vernacular art and photography. Dilettante published only three titles, but "their impact was considerable." Dilettante produced exhibitions, symposiums, and parties related to their books in galleries and museums in multiple cities in the U.S. and in Europe.

In 2005, Wille founded Process Media with her then-partner (later, husband) Adam Parfrey of Feral House. The imprint focuses on non-fiction, literary memoirs, and illustrated books exploring subcultures and groundbreaking artists such as Andy Kaufman, Roky Erickson and the 13th Floor Elevators, John Sinclair and MC5, Father Yod and Ya Ho Wha 13, and Moondog.  Process has also created a "Self-Reliance Series" of illustrated guide books that promote sustainable and self-sufficient living.

Curating

In 2000, Wille, Hedi El Kholti, and Cheryl Dunn co-curated the first exhibition of the work of amateur photographer Gary Lee Boas, "Starstruck: Photographs from Fan", at Deitch Projects. This led to exhibitions at galleries and museums in the U.S. and throughout Europe including Yerba Buena Center for the Arts in San Francisco, The Photographers' Gallery in London, and Galerie Kamel Mennour in Paris.

In 2013, Wille was named as co-curator with Rebecca Alban Hoffberger of the American Visionary Art Museum exhibition The Visionary Experience: St. Francis to Finster, a 44-artist, 244-works exhibition which ran 2014-2015.

Since 2014, Wille has curated several exhibitions of photographs, art, costumes, and ephemera produced by the extraterrestrial-channeling spiritual school Unarius Academy of Science, including a 2016 exhibition at the London arts venue The Horse Hospital, works in The Visionary Experience exhibition at American Visionary Art Museum, a 2016 exhibition at The Standard Hotel Hollywood, and at the 2017 Basilisk exhibition at Nicodim Gallery in Los Angeles.

Film Programming and Cultural Events
Over the years, Wille has programmed films and curated cultural events in several cities. From 2007-2017, Wille served as a regular guest programmer at The Cinefamily cinematheque in Los Angeles, hosting the popular "Occult LA" series and other programs including an eclectic range of guests from Kris Kristofferson, Tony Clifton, Rocky Erickson, and Tom Laughlin to white witches, Hare Krishnas, and Bigfoot researchers, as well as live music, ritual performance, panels, and art exhibitions.

In 2015, Wille presented a retrospective of the films of the Unarius Academy of Science at Cinefamily, which included a Unariun art and artifact exhibition and Unariun workshops. This led to invitations to present Unarius films at the 2015 San Francisco International Film Festival and the Horse Hospital arts center in London.

Selected works

Documentary Film
The Source Family (2012, 98 mins.), directed with Maria Demopoulos

We Are Not Alone (2016, 11 mins.)

Music videos (Selected Works)
R.E.M. - "Find the River" (1994)
The Meices - "Daddy's Gone to California" (4/14/94)
Wool - "Kill the Crow" (5/10/94) also producer
Local H - "Cynic" (2/3/95) also editor
Jennifer Trynin - "Happier" (1995)
Hot Damn "My Panties Are Too Tight" (7/30/96)

Publishing and Editing (Selected Works) 
Starstruck: Photographs from a Fan by Gary Lee Boas. Foreword by Michael Musto. Afterword by Carlo McCormick. Edited by Jodi Wille, Photo Editor: Hedi El Kholti (Dilettante Press, 2000).
Gary Lee Boas: New York Sex 1979–1985. Essay by Bruce Hainley, edited by Hedi El Kholti and Jodi Wille (text editor). (Editions Kamel Mennour, 2003).
Go Ask Ogre: Letters from a Deathrock Cutter by Jolene Siana, edited by Jodi Wille (Process Media, 2005).
Sex Machines: Photographs and Interviews by Timothy Archibald, edited by Jodi Wille (Process Media, 2005).
The Source: The Untold Story of Father Yod, Ya Ho Wa 13, and The Source Family by Isis Aquarian and Electricity Aquarian. Introduction by Erik Davis. Edited by Jodi Wille (Process Media, 2007).
Pure Country: The Leon Kagarise Archives 1961–1971 by Leon Kagarise. Essays by Eddie Dean and Robert Gordon, edited by Jodi Wille (Process Media, 2008).
Master of the Mysteries: The Life of Manly Palmer Hall by Louis Sahagun, edited by Jodi Wille (Process Media, 2008).
Dear Andy Kaufman, I Hate Your Guts! by Lynne Margullies, edited by Jodi Wille and Lissi Erwin (Process Media, 2009).

Awards
Dear Andy Kaufman, I Hate Your Guts! (Process Media) Gold Medal, Best Popular Culture Book, 2010 Independent Book Awards
The Source: The Untold Story of Father Yod, Ya Ho Wa 13, and the Source Family, (Process Media) Bronze: Best Popular Culture Book, 2008 Independent Book Awards
Sex Machines: Photographs and Interviews, (Process Media) Winner: Best Book on Sexuality/Relationships, 2006 Independent Publisher Awards
Starstruck: Photographs from a Fan (Dilettante Press) included in Artforum's "Best of 2000" issue (Boas image on cover).
Go Ask Ogre: Letters from a Deathrock Cutter, (Process Media) Finalist: Best Juvenile/Teen Young Adult Non-fiction, 2006 Independent Publisher Awards
The End is Near: Visions of Apocalypse, Millennium and Utopia, (Dilettante Press) Winner: Benjamin Franklin Award for Best First Book, 1998

References

External links

jodiwille.com
THE SOURCE FAMILY documentary website
Filmmaker Magazine interview with Jodi Wille and Maria Demopoulos
LA Times: THE SOURCE FAMILY Comes Home to Hollywood, On Its Own Terms
The New York Times Article on THE SOURCE FAMILY
"Bring Your Own Doc" video interview with Ondi Timoner, Jodi Wille, and Maria Demopoulos
Process Media

Year of birth missing (living people)
American book editors
American photographers
Living people
Writers from Port Townsend, Washington
American women photographers
21st-century American women
American women curators
American curators